The Punjab Railway  was one of the pioneering railway companies that operated during the British Raj between 1855 and 1885 in Punjab.

History
The Punjab Railway was established shortly after the Scinde Railway Act of Parliament in July 1855 was passed. The Punjab Railway began soon after the Karachi-Kotri Railway Line opened in 13 May 1861. The Indus Flotilla was set up to transport passengers from Kotri to Multan by steamship. From Multan, a new railway line began being laid from to Lahore and onwards to Amritsar. The line opened in 1861 and in 1870, the Punjab Railway was amalgamated with the Scinde Railway and Delhi Railway companies and renamed as the Scinde, Punjab & Delhi Railway company.

Rolling stock 
By the end of 1864 the company owned 8 steam locomotives, 36 coaches and 140 goods wagons.

See also 
 History of rail transport in Pakistan
 Pakistan Railways
 Scinde, Punjab & Delhi Railway

References

External links 
 W P Andrew, The Punjaub Railway (London: W H Allen, 1857).
 "Karachi to Kotri: The First Railways in Pakistan". 17/09/2009.  All things Pakistan, now an archived website

Transport in Lahore
Transport in Amritsar
Transport in Multan
Defunct railway companies of India
Defunct railway companies of Pakistan
Indian companies established in 1855
Railway companies established in 1855